On the Yorkshire Buses is a British television documentary programme narrated by Simon Farnaby, first broadcast on Channel 5 in the United Kingdom between 11 July and 29 August 2014. The show follows various staff from the East Yorkshire Motor Services, a bus and coach operator operating throughout Kingston upon Hull, the  East Riding of Yorkshire, the North Yorkshire coast and the North York Moors, as they overcome problems to perform their daily jobs.

Episode list

Notes

References

External links

2014 British television series debuts
2014 British television series endings
2010s British documentary television series
British travel television series
Channel 5 (British TV channel) original programming
English-language television shows
Television shows set in Yorkshire
Documentary films about road transport
Television series by ITV Studios